Barry Murphy (born 7 July 1975) is an Irish former hurler who played as a left corner-forward for the Clare senior team.

Murphy made his first appearance for the team during the 1997 championship and was a regular member of the starting fifteen until his retirement after the 2004 championship. During that time he won one All-Ireland medal and one Munster medal.

At club level Murphy continues to play with Scariff.

References

1975 births
Living people
Scariff hurlers
Clare inter-county hurlers
All-Ireland Senior Hurling Championship winners
People educated at St Colman's College, Fermoy